Lancashire (North), formerly known as North Lancashire 1 was a regional (tier 8) English Rugby Union league for teams from the South Lancashire and Manchester area. The league champions were promoted to North Lancashire/Cumbria while the runners had a playoff against the runners up from the Cumbria League for the final promotion spot.  

The division was initially known as North-West East 1 when it was created in 1987, and had a number of different names since with North Lancashire 1 being the longest running.  The most recent version known as Lancashire (North) was set up for the 2015-16 season when the RFU decided to break up the South Lancs/Cheshire league into 3 different zones also included Merseyside (West) and Cheshire (South).  The format was not a success and South Lancs/Cheshire was resurrected for the 2016-17 with only Lancashire (North) remaining albeit with 12 teams instead of 14.  When it was known as Lancashire Division 1 teams were relegated to North Lancashire 2.

After reinstating the league for one more season, at the end of 2016-17 the RFU again decided to cancel the league.  Teams were instead transferred to the new Lancs/Cheshire 3 (North) division - which was created from breaking South Lancs/Cheshire 3 into two regional leagues.

Participating Clubs 2016-17
Ashton-under-Lyne (relegated from North Lancashire/Cumbria)
Burnley
Bury
Colne & Nelson
Didsbury Toc H
Garstang
North Manchester
Pendle
Ormskirk
Orrell
Tarleton
Thornton Cleveleys

Participating Clubs 2015-16

Participating Clubs 2014-15
Ashton-Under-Lyne
Birchfield (promoted from North Lancashire 2)
Burnley
Didsbury TOC H
Garstang
Littleborough (relegated from North Lancashire/Cumbria)
North Manchester (promoted from North Lancashire 2)
Oldham
St Edward's O.B.
Thornton Cleveleys
Trafford MV

Participating Clubs 2013-14
Ashton-Under-Lyne (promoted from North Lancashire 2)
Burnley
De La Salle (Salford)
Didsbury Toc H (relegated from North Lancashire/Cumbria)
Garstang
Heaton Moor (relegated from North Lancashire/Cumbria) 
Hutton	
Mossley Hill
Oldham
St Edward's Old Boys
Thornton Cleveleys (promoted from North Lancashire 2)
Trafford MV

Participating Clubs 2012-13
Bolton
Burnley
Bury
De La Salle (Salford)
Garstang
Hutton
Mossley Hill
North Manchester
Oldham
St Edward's Old Boys
Tarleton
Trafford MV

Original teams
When league rugby began in 1987 this division contained the following teams:

Ashton-on-Mersey
Ashton-under-Lyne
Bowden
Congleton
De La Salle (Salford)
Kersal
Metrovick
North Manchester
Old Bedians
Old Salians
Tyldesley 
Vickers

Lancashire (North) honours

North-West East 1 (1987–1992)

The original incarnation of North Lancashire 1 was known as North-West East 1, and was a tier 10 league with promotion up to North-West East/North 1 and relegation down to North-West East 2.

Lancashire North 1 (1992–1996)

North-West East 1 was renamed as Lancashire North 1 for the start of the 1992–93 season with promotion to Cumbria/Lancs North (formerly North-West East/North 1) and relegation to Lancashire North 2 (formerly North-West East 2).  Initially a tier 10 league, the creation of National 5 North for the 1993–94 season meant that Lancashire North 1 dropped to become a tier 11 league.

North Lancashire 1 (1996–2000)

The league system was restructured from top to bottom by the Rugby Football Union for the start of the 1996–97 season.  Lancashire North 1 was renamed as North Lancashire 1, and the cancellation of National 5 North and creation of North West 3 meant that it remained a tier 11 league.  Promotion was to North Lancs/Cumbria (formerly Cumbria/Lancs North) while relegation was to North Lancashire 2 (formerly Lancashire North 2).

North Lancashire 1 (2000–2015)

Northern league restructuring by the RFU at the end of the 1999–00 season saw the cancellation of North West 1, North West 2 and North West 3 (tiers 7-9).  This meant that North Lancashire 1 became a tier 8 league, with promotion continuing to North Lancs/Cumbria and relegation to North Lancashire 2.

Lancashire (North) (2015–2017)

North Lancashire 1 was renamed as Lancashire (North) at the start of the 2015–16 as part of North-West league restructuring by the RFU who decided to break up the North Lancashire and South Lancs/Cheshire leagues into 3 different zones - Cheshire (South), Lancashire (North) and Merseyside (West).  Promotion would continue into North Lancashire/Cumbria but the cancellation of North Lancashire 2 meant there would be no relegation.  After two seasons Lancashire (North) would be discontinued and all teams transferred into Lancs/Cheshire 3.

Promotion play-offs
Since the 2000–01 season there was a play-off between the runners-up of the Cumbria League and Lancashire (North) for the third and final promotion place to North Lancashire/Cumbria. The team with the superior league record had home advantage in the tie.  At the end of the 2016–17 season the Lancashire (North) teams have been the most successful with eleven wins to the Cumbria League teams four; and the home team has won promotion on twelve occasions compared to the away teams three.

Number of league titles

De La Salle (Salford) (7)
Trafford MV (3)
Aldwinians (2)
Fleetwood (2)
Heaton Moor (2)
Oldham (2)
Tarleton (2)
Altrincham Kersal (1)
Ashton-on-Mersey (1)
Ashton-under-Lyne (1)
Blackpool (1)
Bolton (1)
Crewe & Nantwich (1)
Furness (1)
Kirkby Lonsdale (1)
Littleborough (1)
Old Salians (1)

Notes

See also
 North Lancashire 2
 Lancashire RFU
 Cheshire (South)
 Merseyside (West)
 English rugby union system
 Rugby union in England

References

Defunct rugby union leagues in England
Rugby union in Lancashire